Kharaqan-e Gharbi Rural District is a rural district (dehestan) in Central District, Avaj County, Qazvin Province, Iran. At the 2006 census, its population was 2,081, in 575 families.  The rural district has 9 villages.

References 

Rural Districts of Qazvin Province
Avaj County